Senator Hart may refer to:

U.S. senators
Gary Hart (born 1936), U.S. Senator from Colorado from 1975 to 1987
Philip Hart (1912–1976), U.S. Senator from Michigan from 1959 to 1976
Thomas C. Hart (1877–1971), U.S. Senator from Connecticut from 1945 to 1946

Senators of American state legislatures
Alphonso Hart (1830–1910), Ohio State Senate
Alvin N. Hart (1804–1874), Michigan State Senate
Elijah Carson Hart (1854–1929), California State Senate
 Ephraim Hart (NY politician) (1774–1839), New York State Senate (1817-1822)
Gary K. Hart (born 1943), California State Senate
George D. Hart (1846–1932), Massachusetts State Senate
George Z. Hart (1924–2013), Michigan State Senate
 Jack Hart (state senator), Massachusetts State Senate (2002-2013)
Jack Hart (state senator), Massachusetts State Senate
Jerome T. Hart (1932–1995), Michigan State Senate
John M. Hart (1866–1955), Virginia State Senate
Melissa Hart (politician) (born 1962), Pennsylvania State Senate
Rita Hart (born 1970), Iowa State Senate
Rufus Erastus Hart (1812–1891), Ohio State Senate
Truman Hart (1784–1838), New York State Senate
Dennis J. Harte (1866–1917), New York State Senate